The Golden Boat (Spanish: La barca de oro) is a 1947 Mexican film. It stars Carlos Orellana.

External links
 

1947 films
1947 drama films
Mexican drama films
1940s Spanish-language films
Films directed by Joaquín Pardavé
Mexican black-and-white films
Films scored by Manuel Esperón
1940s Mexican films